Kenneth Beck (April 19, 1915 – May 1, 1982) was an American water polo player. He competed at the 1936 Summer Olympics and the 1948 Summer Olympics. In 1976, he was inducted into the USA Water Polo Hall of Fame.

References

External links
 

1915 births
1982 deaths
American male water polo players
Olympic water polo players of the United States
Water polo players at the 1936 Summer Olympics
Water polo players at the 1948 Summer Olympics
People from Lovelock, Nevada